Johannes Nicolaas 'Johan' Ackermann (born 3 June 1970) is a South African professional rugby union coach and former player. He played as a lock during his playing career between 1995 and 2007. He is currently the head coach at Red Hurricanes.

Playing career
In 2007, Johan Ackermann became the oldest Springbok to play for the national side, at the age of 37. After the 2007 World Cup in France, he was recalled to the Springbok squad to play against the Barbarians. This was his last outing as an international player.

Ackermann bowed out of professional rugby on a winning note on 1 March 2008, when the Sharks defeated the Bulls 29-15 at Loftus Versfeld. He became the oldest player ever in Super Rugby history at age .

Coaching career
Ackermann was the forwards coach of the Lions in Super Rugby under head coach, John Mitchell but after Mitchell left the Union, he took over. He has seen huge success as coach of the Union including winning the SARU Coach of the Year award in 2014, his first year as head coach. He took over as head coach of the Lions Super Rugby and the Golden Lions Currie Cup sides in 2013.

He was appointed as the head coach of English Premiership side Gloucester prior to the 2017–18 season.

He left Gloucester at the end of June 2020 to become head coach at Japanese side Red Hurricanes He was replaced at Gloucester by George Skivington.

Personal
Ackerman is married, with two sons and a daughter. He is a strong Christian.

See also
List of sportspeople sanctioned for doping offences

References

External links

Sharks profile

1970 births
Living people
Afrikaner people
Blue Bulls players
Bulls (rugby union) players
Doping cases in rugby union
Golden Lions players
Griquas (rugby union) players
Lions (United Rugby Championship) players
Rugby union locks
Rugby union players from Benoni
Sharks (Currie Cup) players
Sharks (rugby union) players
South Africa international rugby union players
South African rugby union coaches
South African rugby union players